Deroy Murdock (born 1963) is an American political commentator and a contributing editor with National Review Online. A native of Los Angeles, Murdock lives in New York City. A first-generation American, his parents were born in Costa Rica.

Education
Murdock earned his bachelor's degree in Government from Georgetown University in 1986 and his MBA in Marketing and International Business from New York University in 1989. His MBA program included a semester as an exchange student at the Chinese University of Hong Kong.

Career
Deroy Murdock's columns appear in The New York Post, The Boston Herald, The Washington Times, National Review, The Orange County Register and many other newspapers and magazines in the United States and abroad. He is a Fox News Contributor whose political commentary also has aired on ABC's Nightline, NBC Nightly News, CNN, MSNBC, PBS, other television news channels, and numerous radio outlets.

Murdock is also a Senior Fellow with the Atlas Network in Washington, D.C. and an emeritus Media Fellow with the Hoover Institution at Stanford University. He is a member of the Council on Foreign Relations.

Murdock interned for U.S. Senator Orrin Hatch between 1982 and 1985 and then-U.S. Senator Pete Wilson in summer 1984. Murdock is a veteran of the 1980 and 1984 Reagan for President campaigns and was a communications consultant with Forbes 2000, the White House bid of publisher Steve Forbes. He is openly gay.

In February 2013, Murdock joined the Board of Advisors of the Coalition to Reduce Spending.

Murdock is a producer of I'll Say She Is – the Lost Marx Brothers Musical, which opened on June 2, 2016 at the Connelly Theater in Manhattan's East Village.

Views
Murdock opposes governmental involvement in issues relating to both gay and heterosexual marriage.  He also opposes the War on Drugs.

He said on MSNBC's Hardball with Chris Matthews on September 16, 2007 that he believes Saddam Hussein was involved in perpetrating the September 11, 2001 terrorist attack on America. Murdock cited Smith v. Islamic Emirate of Afghanistan, 262 F. Supp. 2d 217, a federal case heard by U.S. District Judge Harold Baer Jr.
In Smith v. Islamic Emirate of Afghanistan, Judge Baer ruled that Hussein's Baathist government and the Taliban assisted Osama bin Laden and al-Qaeda. Judge Baer—whom President Clinton nominated in April 1994—ordered Hussein, Iraq's former government, and this case's other losing parties to pay $104 million in civil damages to the families of George Eric Smith and Timothy Soulas, both murdered on September 11, 2001 at the World Trade Center. Judge Baer added: "Again, since the al-Qaeda defendants and Iraq are jointly and severally liable, they are all responsible for the payment of any judgment that may be entered."

See also
 Black conservatism in the United States

References

External links
 National Review columns
 
 Biography at the Institute for Humane Studies
 Smith v. Islamic Emirate of Afg. 262 F. Supp. 2d 217 
 CBSNews.com: "Court Rules: Al Qaida, Iraq Linked"
 Saddam Hussein's Philanthropy of Terror
 Article on Dean's World
 Clip from MSNBC's 1600 Pennsylvania Avenue
 I'll Say She Is – the Lost Marx Brothers Musical

1963 births
Living people
American columnists
American male journalists
American people of Costa Rican descent
American political writers
E. W. Scripps Company people
Georgetown University alumni
American gay writers
Hispanic and Latino American people
American LGBT journalists
LGBT people from California
National Review people
New York (state) Republicans
New York University Stern School of Business alumni
The Washington Times people
Writers from Los Angeles
Writers from New York City
LGBT conservatism in the United States
Black conservatism in the United States
21st-century LGBT people